Brette Taylor is an American actress and country music singer-songwriter.

Taylor was born in Cincinnati and raised in NYC. She graduated High School of Performing Arts and also studied with the Cincinnati Ballet Preparatory Company at the University of Cincinnati – College-Conservatory of Music.

She began her acting career in theater, television and film, including guest-starring appearances in the multiple episodes in the Law & Order franchise, Spin City, Numb3rs and Unforgettable. She had the recurring role in the FX series, Rescue Me in 2005. Also in 2005, she release her debut studio album called Breaking News. In film, she had a supporting role in Laws of Attraction opposite Julianne Moore.

In 2014, Taylor was cast as Martha Wayne in the pilot episode of Fox series, Gotham. Later in that year she joined the cast of ABC drama series, Nashville as singer named Pam York.

Filmography

References

External links
 

Living people
American television actresses
American film actresses
American stage actresses
Actresses from Cincinnati
20th-century American actresses
21st-century American actresses
American women singer-songwriters
American women country singers
American country singer-songwriters
Musicians from Cincinnati
Year of birth missing (living people)
Singer-songwriters from Ohio
Country musicians from Ohio